Schistura diminuta is a species of stone loach from the genus Schistura. It has so far only been recorded from the Kong River from the Mekong River drainage in Cambodia. Its describers described it as a "miniature species".

References 

D
Taxa named by Chouly Ou
Taxa named by Carmen G. Montaña
Taxa named by Kirk O. Winemiller
Taxa named by Kevin W. Conway
Fish described in 2011